Hoseynabad (also Romanized as Ḩoseynābād; also known as Ḩoseynābād-e ‘Alī Asghar Man Dūst) is a village in Chenaran Rural District, in the Central District of Chenaran County, Razavi Khorasan Province, Iran. At the 2006 census, its population was 114, in 30 families.

References 

Populated places in Chenaran County